James Nicholls is a former professional rugby league footballer who played in the 1940s. He played at club level for Castleford (Heritage № 215). H was born 1.12.1915 in Lancashire and died 16.01.1982 in Pontefract General Infirmary.

References

External links
Search for "Nicholls" at rugbyleagueproject.org
Jim Nicholls Memory Box Search at archive.castigersheritage.com

Castleford Tigers players
English rugby league players
Place of birth missing
Year of birth missing